The 1998 World Lacrosse Championship was the eighth edition of the international men's lacrosse championship.  The event took place in Baltimore, Maryland under the auspices of the International Lacrosse Federation.  This was the second time that the tournament was held in Baltimore, following the 1982 tournament. Eleven teams competed in the event in two divisions.

The United States successfully defended their title for the fifth consecutive time, defeating Canada 15–14 in double overtime in the final. The championship game – in which Canada overcame a ten-goal deficit in the third quarter to force overtime – is considered by some to be the most exciting lacrosse game in history.

Australia beat the Iroquois team 17–5 for third place.

Pool play

For the pool play phase of the tournament, the teams were divided into two divisions – five in the top Blue Division and six in the Red Division.  Only Blue Division participants were able to compete for the championship.

Blue Division

Red Division

Championship Round

Consolation round

5th-8th place

9th place

Final standings

See also
 1998 World Lacrosse Championship Final
 Field lacrosse
 World Lacrosse, the governing body for world lacrosse
 World Lacrosse Championship

References

External links
 World Lacrosse
 1998 World Lacrosse Championships

1998
1998
World Lacrosse Championship
World Lacrosse
Lacrosse in Maryland